Postinflammatory hypopigmentation is a cutaneous condition characterized by decreased pigment in the skin following inflammation of the skin.

See also 
 Postinflammatory hyperpigmentation
 Skin lesion

References 

 
Disturbances of human pigmentation